Bénévent-l’Abbaye is a commune in the Creuse department in the Nouvelle-Aquitaine region in central France.

Geography
The town is on the Way of St. James pilgrimage route.

Population

Sights

 The abbey church of St. Barthélémy, dating from the twelfth century.

See also
Communes of the Creuse department

References

External links

 Some tourist information and photos 

Communes of Creuse